The Newport and District Football League (currently billed as The Monmouthshire Building Society Newport and District Football League for sponsorship reasons) is a football league covering the city of Newport and surrounding areas in South Wales. The headquarters are located at Newport Civic Centre.

Area
The League's area consists of the city of Newport and the surrounding part of the historic county of Monmouthshire as far west as the county boundary at Bedwas, as far north-west as Abercarn and Wattsville, as far north-east  as Sebastopol Bridge, and as far east as Llanwern, and Nash.

Member clubs 2022–23 and divisions
The league is composed of four divisions plus a Sunday division. The top-level consists of a premier division split into "Premier X" and "Premier Y" (for reserve teams), and two feeder divisions numbered 1 and 2.

Premier 'X'

AFC Pontymister reserves
Alway
Graig Villa Dino reserves
Greenmeadow
Llanyrafon AFC
Marshfield
Mill Street Dynamo
Newport Civil Service reserves

Premier 'Y'

Caerleon reserves
Coed Eva Athletic reserves
Cwmbran Celtic third team
Lliswerry reserves
Lucas Cwmbran reserves
Newport Corinthians reserves
Newport Saints reserves
Pill reserves
Rogerstone reserves

Division One

Albion Rovers reserves
Caerleon Town
Croesyceiliog Athletic
Newport Corinthians third team
Newport Eagles
Newport Saints third team
Pill third team
Pontnewydd United reserves
Rogerstone third team

Division Two

AFC Pontymister third team
Caerleon Town reserves
Court Farm
Cwmcarn Athletic reserves
Machen reserves
Mill Street Dynamo reserves
Newport Eagles reserves
River Usk

Promotion and relegation
The Premier 'X' Division champions (or runners-up if the champions do not meet ground criteria) are promoted to the Gwent County League. Promotion and relegation also applies to the two bottom clubs of Division One and the two top clubs of Division Two. Promotion to the Premier division from Division One and relegation from the Premier division is at the discretion of the league's Executive Committee. Clubs requesting places in the Premier Division will be interviewed by the Executive Committee.

Champions (Top Division)

Information provided by the league.

Pre 1950s

 1903–04: – Tydu Oddfellows
 1904–05: – Orb W.M.C.
 1905–06: – Orb W.M.C.
 1949–50: – Beechwood

1950s

 1950–51: – Caerleon
 1951–52: – St. Julians
 1952–53: – Caerleon
 1953–54: – St. Julians
 1954–55: – St. Julians
 1955–56: – St. Julians
 1956–57: – Central YMCA
 1957–58: – Central YMCA
 1958–59: – Maesglas
 1959–60: – 	Docks United

1960s

 1960–61: – Maesglas
 1961–62: – S.T.C.
 1962–63: – Christchurch
 1963–64: – Cashmore Corries
 1964–65: – Cashmore Corries
 1965–66: – Christchurch 
 1966–67: – Christchurch
 1967–68: – Pontnewydd
 1968–69: – Ebbw Bridge Hibernians
 1969–70: – Cwnbran R. C.

1970s

 1970–71: – Ebbw Bridge Hibernians
 1971–72: – Central YMCA
 1972–73: – Central YMCA
 1973–74: – Brynglas Dynamo
 1974–75: – B. R. S.
 1975–76: – Spencer BC
 1976–77: – Spencer BC
 1977–78: – Spencer BC
 1978–79: – Lliswerry
 1979–80: – Spencer BC

1980s

 1980–81: – Spencer BC
 1981–82: – 
 1982–83: – Crindau United
 1983–84: – Lliswerry
 1984–85: – Malpas Unionists
 1985–86: – Pill
 1986–87: – Malpas
 1987–88: – Abercarn Rangers
 1988–89: – Golden Harvester
 1989–90: – Golden Harvester

1990s

 1990–91: – Golden Harvester
 1991–92: – Greenmeadow
 1992–93: – Abercarn Town
 1993–94: – Abercarn Town
 1994–95: – Girlings
 1995–96: – West Pontnewydd
 1996–97: – Cromwell
 1997–98: – Bettws Social
 1998–99: – Greenmeadow
 1999–00: – Bettws Social

2000s

 2000–01: – Bettws Social
 2001–02: – Whiteheads
 2002–03: – Pill Hibernians
 2003–04: – Caerleon Town
 2004–05: – Pioneer FC
 2005–06: – Pioneer FC
 2006–07: – Pioneer FC
 2007–08: – Llanwern RTB
 2008–09: – Marshfield
 2009–10: – Marshfield

2010s

 2010–11: – K-2
 2011–12: – Ponthir 
 2012–13: – Pontnewydd United
 2013–14: – West of St Julians
 2014–15: – Villa Dino Christchurch
 2015–16: – Machen
 2016–17: – Cwmcarn Athletic
 2017–18: – Cromwell Youth
 2018–19: – Whiteheads Rhisga
 2019–20: – Riverside Rovers

2020s

 2020–21: – No competition due to Covid-19 pandemic
 2021–22: – Marshfield

References

External links
 Newport and District Football League

Sport in Newport, Wales
8
Sports leagues established in 1901
1901 establishments in Wales